At least three ships of the Peruvian Navy have been named BAP Gálvez or BAP Teniente Gálvez:

 , was a  launched in 1943 as USS Woonsocket she was transferred to Peru in 1948 named initially as Teniente Gálvez and subsequently Gálvez. She was stricken in 1961.
 , was an  launched in 1944 as USS Ruddy she was transferred to Peru in 1960. In 1975 she was transferred to the Peruvian Coast guard
 , was a  launched in 1954 as HNLMS Groningen she was transferred to Peru in 1981 serving until being decommissioned in 1991

Peruvian Navy ship names